Conrad the Sailor is a 1942 Warner Bros. Merrie Melodies cartoon supervised by Chuck Jones. The title character, Conrad the Cat, is voiced by Pinto Colvig and animated by the quintet (Jones’ regular animators, including Ben Washam). The other featured player is Daffy Duck, voiced as usual by Mel Blanc.

Plot

The story takes place aboard a battleship staffed by anthropomorphic cats (which strangely look more like dogs with their small ears), most of whom are singing "The Song of the Marines (Shovin' Right Off Again)" as a chorale group. Cut to Conrad, who talks and sings exactly like Colvig's characterization of the Walt Disney character "Goofy".

As Conrad swabs the deck, he is interrupted by Daffy when he spots the duck’s muddy footprints on the deck and Daffy on the mast, and he angrily mutters the song to himself. On the mast, Daffy paces back and forth, mocking Conrad's singing, then remarks to the audience, "Phew, is that guy awful? Gee, it makes me sick". Conrad tries to ignore Daffy and his pranks, growing more suspicious and annoyed at Daffy, who deliberately swaps Conrad's water bucket with a paint bucket, causing Conrad to paint the deck, to which Daffy comments "Very sloppy, Roscoe. You're a slovenly housekeeper". Conrad angrily throws the mop at Daffy, who then catches it, uses it in a short vaudeville routine before tossing the mop into the air, and shouts to Conrad "Catch! Catch!", only the mop lands on Conrad's head. The camera angle shows Daffy on top of the mop, again taunting to Conrad "Very petite, Betsy. Very, very petite" before sliding down the mop and an infuriated Conrad, twisting him and the mop. Conrad finally gets fed up with Daffy, and proceeds to chase him, but Daffy outsmarts him at every turn from hiding in a lifeboat and after Conrad mistakes him for a telescope, keeping watch for Daffy. A running gag in the picture is that all action screeches to a halt whenever the ship's diminutive Admiral scurries by, as both sailor and duck snap to attention and salute. The final gag involves Conrad and Daffy being chased by a shell from one of the ship's big guns. All three, including the shell, snap to attention as the Admiral walks by, before the chase continues as the cartoon ends with an iris out.

Innovation
Animator John McGrew first used match cuts in this short where different objects in separate scenes have the same basic shape, with McGrew giving the example of a gun and a cloud.

Home media
Conrad the Sailor is available on the Looney Tunes Golden Collection: Volume 4 Disc 4.

See also
 Looney Tunes and Merrie Melodies filmography (1940–1949)

References

External links

Conrad the Sailor on the Internet Archive

Merrie Melodies short films
1942 films
1942 short films
Warner Bros. short films
Warner Bros. Cartoons animated short films
1942 animated films
Short films directed by Chuck Jones
Daffy Duck films
Animated films about cats
1940s Warner Bros. animated short films